Buile Hill Park is a Grade II listed public park in Salford, Greater Manchester, England. Covering  it is the largest public park in the city, as well as the second oldest after Peel Park. The park and mansion are owned by Salford City Council. The Friends of Buile Hill Park is a non-profit society which contributes to activities in the park and how it is managed.

History
In 1590, victims of the plague had been buried in Hart Hill Meadow, which had been bought by the local authorities.

John Potter of Tadcaster (1728-1802) was firstly a draper and had a shop in Tadcaster. All his children were born in this shop. John also took on a farm at Wighill and then one he rented from Sir Walter Vavasour at Wingate Hill. Two of his sons, William and Richard, opened a warehouse at no 2, Cannon Street, Manchester in 1802. They were joined there on 1 January 1803, by their brother, Thomas. They created the firm of William, Thomas and Richard Potter. William left the firm in 1806. Thomas and Richard Potter formed a small band of free traders and reformers which lasted for more than a quarter of a century. They used to meet in Thomas and Richard's "plotting parlour" situated at the back of their Cannon Street warehouse.

In 1825 Thomas Potter commissioned Sir Charles Barry to build him a mansion at Buile Hill.  This is the only known house where Barry used Greek revival architecture. This was completed in 1827.  Thomas was elected first Mayor of Manchester in 1838 and was re-elected in 1839. He was knighted on 1 July 1840. Sir Thomas, who had been born in Tadcaster in 1774, died on 20 March 1845 at Buile Hill. His widow, Lady Potter, née Esther Bayley, continued to live at Buile Hill until her death there on 19 June 1852. This legal document provides prove of ownership and occupancy of Buile Hill in 1852 & 1860

Thomas Bayley Potter was still running the family business, trading as Messrs Potter & Taylor, in 1865, the year in which he became M.P. for Rochdale after the death of Richard Cobden. In 1877 Potter sold Buile Hill to John Marsland Bennet, timber merchant and local landowner, who had been Mayor of Manchester in 18631865.

Salford Corporation purchased the estate in 1902 for £20,000. A further £7,000 allocated for conversion to a public park under the supervision of the Parks Superintendent, A. Wilsher (Salford Reporter, 25 July 1903). Local residents subscribed £2,500 towards the project. Buile Hill Park was opened on 22 July 1903 by the mayor of Salford, Alderman Stephens, and was subsequently joined to Seedley Park by the closure of the 'Dog Entry' path which divided them.

A public park incorporating Seedley Park, opened in 1876, together with the grounds of Buile Hill house which opened as a public park in 1903, of Springfield villa added in 1927, and of Hart Hill house purchased in 1924 and opened in 1938.

In 1906, the former Buile Hill House opened to the public as a natural history museum.

In 1906, the tennis courts opened, followed in 1934 by the 18 hole pitch and putt course. In 1938, a cafe was opened in the former Buile Hill estate conservatory.

During both world wars, Buile Hill was used as a military base. In the First World War it became the site of an anti-Zeppelin gun base, while in the Second World War it became home to a barrage balloon attachment. Resultantly, in 1940 the German Luftwaffe dropped a bomb on Buile Hill.

After the end of the war, and an amount of refurbishment, the park reopened to the public in 1948. In 1963, a garden for the blind opened, and in 1972 Pets Corner.

People noted to have visited the park include Pendlebury artist L.S. Lowry, a local rent collector, and author Frances Hodgson Burnett who wrote her classic children's novel The Secret Garden during one of her many visits to the estate house.

In 1975 the Lancashire Museum of Mining opened in the house, closed in 2000, after which the house was proposed to be renovated as a conference centre. However, it has remained empty since 2000. Planning permission was granted to John Wilkinson to turn it into a country hotel in 2008, which received very negative feedback from locals and heritage groups. However, the £700,000 purchase fee was never paid to the council, and the permission expired in 2014. Since then several companies have proposed to turn it into a hotel.

A two-storey derelict outbuilding at the park caught fire in October 2016.

References

External links
Buile Hill Park @ Salford Council
Friends of Buile Hill Park

Buildings and structures in Salford
Parks and commons in Salford
Tourist attractions in Salford
Grade II listed buildings in the City of Salford